Hoseynabad-e Eslami may refer to:
 Hoseynabad-e Eslami, Rafsanjan